Benjamin V. "Ben" Sanchez (born March 11, 1975) is an American attorney, accountant, and politician serving as a member of the Pennsylvania House of Representatives from the 153rd district. Elected in November 2018, he assumed office on December 1, 2018.

Early life and education 
Sanchez was born in Abington Township, Montgomery County, Pennsylvania. He earned a Bachelor of Science degree in accounting from Villanova University and a Juris Doctor from the Temple University Beasley School of Law.

Career 
Since graduating from law school, Sanchez has worked as a Certified Public Accountant and attorney. He was also an adjunct professor of law at the Thomas R. Kline School of Law. From 2014 to 2018, he was a member of the Abington Township Commission. He was elected to the Pennsylvania House of Representatives in November 2018 and assumed office on December 1, 2018. Sanchez currently sits on the Appropriations, Health, Local Government, and State Government committees.

References 

1975 births
Living people
People from Abington Township, Montgomery County, Pennsylvania
American accountants
Pennsylvania lawyers
Villanova University alumni
Temple University Beasley School of Law alumni
Democratic Party members of the Pennsylvania House of Representatives